Out of Control is a Nancy Drew and the Hardy Boys Supermystery crossover novel written by Carolyn Keene. It was published in 1997.

Synopsis
Indianapolis is the place to be for the Indianapolis 500, the legendary motor race. Nancy Drew is on the scene, saving a sportswear fashion designer and a crowd of supermodels from a photo set disaster.  Nancy, in return, is invited to an exclusive party, where she witnesses the fashionista arrested by a federal agent. Meanwhile, Robbie McDonnell, a local racecar driver, and his entire team is experiencing mishaps and mayhem, and the Hardy Boys investigate the sabotage. A sniper and fire bring the investigators together.

References

External links
Out of Control at Fantastic Fiction
Supermystery series books

Supermystery
1997 American novels
1997 children's books
Novels set in Indianapolis
Indianapolis 500
Motorsports in fiction